Micranthes odontoloma is a species of flowering plant known by the common name brook saxifrage. It is native to much of western North America, where it can be found in many types of moist and rocky habitat types. It is a perennial herb growing from a caudex and rhizome system. It produces a clump of leaves with rounded, toothed, or scalloped blades on long, thin petioles. The branching inflorescence arises on a slender, erect peduncle up to half a meter tall bearing many flowers. Each flower has five teardrop-shaped white petals with threadlike bases, and stamens with flat, narrow filaments that sometimes resemble additional petals.

The leaves are edible, and can be cooked to reduce their toughness.

References

External links
Jepson Manual Treatment
Photo gallery

odontoloma
Flora of the Northwestern United States
Flora of California
Flora of New Mexico
Flora of the Cascade Range
Flora of the Klamath Mountains
Flora of the Sierra Nevada (United States)
Leaf vegetables
Flora without expected TNC conservation status